Gregory Hutchinson may refer to:

Gregory Hutchinson (classicist) (born 1957), British classicist and academic
Gregory Hutchinson (musician) (born 1970), American jazz drummer